Lucas da Silva Lucas known as Lucas Silva or just Lucas (born 25 November 1980) is a Brazilian footballer who plays for Nacional (AM).

Biography
Lucas signed a 3-year contract with Paulista FC in 2003.

In September 2005 he was signed by Juventude.

In August 2006 he was signed by Remo, re-joining Paulista team-mate Julinho He played 2 seasons in 2008 Brazilian second division as first choice right-back, replacing Marquinhos.

In January 2008 he left for Sertãozinho until the end of São Paulo state championship. In April 2008 he was signed by Gama until the end of 2008 Brazilian second division, playing along with his namesake Lucas. After the club relegated, he signed a new 1-year deal.

In June 2009 he returned to Paulista FC in 1-year deal. The club also re-signed Julinho early in May. He played in Brazilian fourth division and 2010 São Paulo state championship.

In June 2010 he was signed by Chapecoense until the end of Brazilian third division.

In 2011 season he played 17 games for São José in 2011 second division of São Paulo state. In July he left for Nacional (AM).

Honours
 Copa do Brasil: 2005

References

External links
 

Brazilian footballers
Paulista Futebol Clube players
Esporte Clube Juventude players
Clube do Remo players
Sertãozinho Futebol Clube players
Sociedade Esportiva do Gama players
Associação Chapecoense de Futebol players
São José Esporte Clube players
Nacional Futebol Clube players
Association football fullbacks
1980 births
Living people
People from Jundiaí
Footballers from São Paulo (state)